Chief Armourer of the Kingdom (also given as Armador-Mor especially in older sources) was a courtly position in the Kingdom of Portugal, instituted by King Afonso V. Their duties consisted of assisting the monarch with dressing in his armour, taking care of the monarch's weapons, and supplying him whenever he was to take arms.

The Chief Armourer was also the depositary of the precious , the oldest and most important roll of arms of the Kingdom, starting with Álvaro da Costa, who occupied the position under King Manuel I in c. 1508–1522. The office became hereditary under Álvaro da Costa, and would later pass to the Counts and Viscounts of Mesquitela.

List of Chief Armourers of the Kingdom
Tentative list published in Luís Caetano de Lima's Geografia Histórica de Todos os Estados Soberanos da Europa (1734):
 Vasco Anes Corte-Real
 Antão de Faria
 Gomes de Figueiredo
 Agostinho Caldeira
 Álvaro da Costa
 Duarte da Costa
 Álvaro da Costa
 Francisco da Costa
 Gonçalo da Costa
 Pedro da Costa
 António Estêvão da Costa
 José da Costa e Sousa
 José Francisco da Costa, 2nd Viscount of Mesquitela
 Luís da Costa de Sousa Macedo e Albuquerque, 1st Count of Mesquitela

References

Portuguese nobility